The 2002 Football League Cup Final was played between Blackburn Rovers and Tottenham Hotspur at the Millennium Stadium, Cardiff, on Sunday, 24 February 2002. Blackburn won the match 2–1 in what was the club's first appearance in the competition's final.

Tottenham were forced to produce a one-off yellow shirt for the final when The Football League decided both of their home and away strips, respectively white and light blue, clashed with Blackburn's blue-and-white home strip.

Blackburn were without defender Craig Short and midfielders Gary Flitcroft and Tugay Kerimoğlu due to suspension. This led to 38 year-old veteran striker Mark Hughes starting in central midfield. Blackburn were also without injured back-up goalkeeper Alan Kelly and cup-tied right-back Lucas Neill.

Blackburn opened the scoring with a goal from Matt Jansen, but Christian Ziege soon equalised for Spurs. Andy Cole scored the winner in the 68th minute with a typical instinctive strike after mistakes in the Spurs defence, mainly from Ledley King. Les Ferdinand could have made the match square after a close one-on-one chance with Friedel, but failed to make anything of it. In the final minute Teddy Sheringham had a claim for a penalty turned down by referee Graham Poll.

Road to Cardiff

Match

Details

References

 

Cup Final
EFL Cup Finals
League Cup Final 2002
League Cup Final 2002
2000s in Cardiff
February 2002 sports events in the United Kingdom
2002 sports events in London